Williams Creek is a stream in Benton County in the U.S. state of Missouri. It is a tributary of Cole Camp Creek.

The name of Williams Creek is attributed to Ezekiel Williams, a pioneer settler.

See also
List of rivers of Missouri

References

Rivers of Benton County, Missouri
Rivers of Missouri